The Gwangju Metropolitan Council is the local council of Gwangju, South Korea.

There are a total of 23 members, with 20 members elected in the First-past-the-post voting system and 3 members elected in Party-list proportional representation.

Current composition 

Negotiation groups can be formed by four or more members. There are currently a negotiation group in the council, formed by the Democratic Party of Korea only.

Organization 
The structure of Council consists of:
Chairman
Two Vice-chairmen
Standing Committees
Steering Committee of Council
Administration and Autonomy Committee
Environment and Welfare Committee
Industry and Construction Committee
Education and Culture Committee
Special Committees
Special Committees on Budget and Accounts
Special Committees on Ethics

Recent election results

2018 

|- style="text-align:center;"
! rowspan="2" colspan="3" width="200" | Party
! colspan="4" | Constituency
! colspan="4" | Party list
! colspan="2" | Total seats
|- style="text-align:center;"
! width="60" | Votes
! width="40" | %
! width="40" | Seats
! width="32" | ±
! width="60" | Votes
! width="40" | %
! width="40" | Seats
! width="32" | ±
! width="40" | Seats
! width="32" | ±
|-
| width="1" style="background-color:" |
| style="text-align:left;" colspan=2| Democratic Party of Korea
| 423,304 || 73.98 || 20 || 1
| 461,406 || 67.47 || 2 || 0
| 22 || 1
|-
| width="1" style="background-color:" |
| style="text-align:left;" colspan=2| Justice Party
| colspan=4 
| 87,327 || 12.77 || 1 || 1
| 1 || 1
|-
| width="1" style="background-color:" |
| style="text-align:left;" colspan=2| Party for Democracy and Peace
| 72,568 || 12.68 || 0 || new
| 56,341 || 8.23 || 0 || new
| 0 || new
|-
| width="1" style="background-color:" |
| style="text-align:left;" colspan=2| Minjung Party
| 32,129 || 5.62 || 0 || new
| 31,417 || 4.59 || 0 || new
| 0 || new
|-
| width="1" style="background-color:" |
| style="text-align:left;" colspan=2| Bareunmirae Party
| 35,160 || 6.15 || 0 || new
| 30,015 || 4.38 || 0 || new
| 0 || new
|-
| width="1" style="background-color:" |
| style="text-align:left;" colspan=2| Liberty Korea Party
| colspan=4 
| 9,465 || 1.38 || 0 || 0
| 0 || 0
|-
| width="1" style="background-color:#DC143C" |
| style="text-align:left;" colspan=2| Labor Party
| colspan=4 
| 4,257 || 0.62 || 0 || 0
| 0 || 0
|-
| width="1" style="background-color:" |
| style="text-align:left;" colspan=2| Green Party Korea
| colspan=4 
| 3,610 || 0.52 || 0 || new
| 0 || new
|-
| width="1" style="background-color:" |
| style="text-align:left;" colspan=2| Independents
| 8,989 || 1.57 || 0 || 0
| colspan=4 
| 0 || 0
|-
|- style="background-color:#E9E9E9"
| colspan=3 style="text-align:center;" | Total
| 572,150 || 100.00 || 20 || –
| 683,838 || 100.00 || 3 || –
| 23 || –
|}

References 

Gwangju
Provincial councils of South Korea